Pine Township is a township in Clearfield County, Pennsylvania, United States. The population was 59 at the 2020 census. S. B. Elliott State Park, a Pennsylvania state park, is in Pine Township. Many of the structures at the park were built by the CCC during the Great Depression and are now on the National Register of Historic Places.

Geography
According to the United States Census Bureau, the township has a total area of 32.0 square miles (83.0 km), all  land.

Community
Anderson Creek

Demographics

As of the census of 2000, there were 77 people, 34 households, and 24 families residing in the township. The population density was 2.4 people per square mile (0.9/km). There were 117 housing units at an average density of 3.7/sq mi (1.4/km). The racial makeup of the township was 100.00% White.

There were 34 households, out of which 26.5% had children under the age of 18 living with them, 67.6% were married couples living together, 2.9% had a female householder with no husband present, and 26.5% were non-families. 26.5% of all households were made up of individuals, and 11.8% had someone living alone who was 65 years of age or older. The average household size was 2.26 and the average family size was 2.52.

In the township the population was spread out, with 18.2% under the age of 18, 3.9% from 18 to 24, 36.4% from 25 to 44, 31.2% from 45 to 64, and 10.4% who were 65 years of age or older. The median age was 41 years. For every 100 females, there were 102.6 males. For every 100 females age 18 and over, there were 90.9 males.

The median income for a household in the township was $53,750, and the median income for a family was $61,875. Males had a median income of $36,500 versus $33,750 for females. The per capita income for the township was $26,319. There were no families and 6.8% of the population living below the poverty line, including no under eighteens and 27.3% of those over 64.

Education
Pine Township is served by the Clearfield Area School District.

References

Populated places established in 1873
Townships in Clearfield County, Pennsylvania
Townships in Pennsylvania